In linear algebra, the transpose of a linear map between two vector spaces, defined over the same field, is an induced map between the dual spaces of the two vector spaces. 
The transpose or algebraic adjoint of a linear map is often used to study the original linear map. This concept is generalised by adjoint functors.

Definition 

Let  denote the algebraic dual space of a vector space  
Let  and  be vector spaces over the same field  
If  is a linear map, then its algebraic adjoint or dual, is the map  defined by  

The continuous dual space of a topological vector space (TVS)  is denoted by  
The map  is called the transpose or algebraic adjoint of  
The following identity characterizes the transpose of  

where  is the natural pairing defined by

Properties 

If  then the space of linear maps is an algebra under composition of maps, and the assignment is then an antihomomorphism of algebras, meaning that  
One can identify  with  using the natural injection into the double dual.
 If  is a (surjective) vector space isomorphism then so is the transpose 

and moreover

Polars 

For any subsets  and  let 
 

 If  and  then

and

Annihilators 

Given subsets  and  define their  (with respect to the canonical dual system) by

and

Duals of quotient spaces 

Let  be a closed vector subspace of a Hausdorff locally convex space  and denote the canonical quotient map by 

Assume  is endowed with the quotient topology induced by the quotient map  

is a TVS-isomorphism onto  
If  is a Banach space then  is also an isometry. 
Using this transpose, every continuous linear functional on the quotient space  is canonically identified with a continuous linear functional in the annihilator  of

Duals of vector subspaces 

Let  be a closed vector subspace of a Hausdorff locally convex space  

which is an isometry if  is a Banach space. 

Denote the inclusion map by

The transpose of the inclusion map is 

whose kernel is the annihilator  and which is surjective by the Hahn–Banach theorem. This map induces an isomorphism of vector spaces

Representation as a matrix 

Relation to the Hermitian adjoint 

The identity that characterizes the transpose, that is,  is formally similar to the definition of the Hermitian adjoint, however, the transpose and the Hermitian adjoint are not the same map. 
The transpose is a map  and is defined for linear maps between any vector spaces  and  without requiring any additional structure. 
The Hermitian adjoint maps  and is only defined for linear maps between Hilbert spaces, as it is defined in terms of the inner product on the Hilbert space. 
The Hermitian adjoint therefore requires more mathematical structure than the transpose.

However, the transpose is often used in contexts where the vector spaces are both equipped with a nondegenerate bilinear form such as the Euclidean dot product or another  inner product. 
In this case, the nondegenerate bilinear form is often used implicitly to map between the vector spaces and their duals, to express the transposed map as a map  
For a complex Hilbert space, the inner product is sesquilinear and not bilinear, and these conversions change the transpose into the adjoint map.

Then  is the following composition of maps:

Applications to functional analysis 

See also

References

Bibliography 

 
  
  
  

Functional analysis
Linear algebra
Linear functionals